A hypospray is a fictional version of a jet injector. Sometimes it is used as a verb, "to hypospray", meaning "to use a hypospray on (someone/something)".

The concept of the hypospray was developed when producers of the original Star Trek series discovered that NBC's broadcast standards and practices prohibited the use of hypodermic syringes to inject medications; the needleless hypospray sidestepped this issue. The prop used in the original series appeared to be a modified fuel injector for a large automotive diesel engine, similar to the engines from which jet injectors were derived.

In the Star Trek universe,
In the Star Trek universe, the hypospray was developed by the mid-22nd century, as it is featured in Star Trek: Enterprise.  Many people, such as Dr. Crusher in Star Trek: The Next Generation, and The Doctor in Star Trek: Voyager and Dr. McCoy in Star Trek: The Original Series are seen using it often.

The device applies medication by spraying it onto the skin, and can used directly or through clothing. The real-life jet injector is usually applied at the top of the arm, but the fictional hypospray is sometimes applied at the neck. It administers medication subcutaneously and intramuscularly.

The hypospray is extremely versatile, as the medicine vials can be quickly swapped out from the bottom of the hypospray. As the hypospray is bloodless, it is not contaminated by use. This allows it to be used on many people until the supply of medicine runs out.

References

External links

Journal articles
Comparison of two steroid preparations used to treat tennis elbow, using the hypospray (1975)
The use of the hypospray in the treatment of minor orthopaedic conditions (1969)
Use of the hypospray jet injector for intra-articular injection (1967)

Star Trek devices